Madriz is a Spanish surname.

People 
It may refer to

Emiliano Madriz, former Supreme Director of Nicaragua
Jhannett Madriz, Venezuelan politician and judge
José Madriz, former President of Nicaragua

Other 
It may also refer to
Madrid , the capital of Spain, using a local accent
Madriz Department, Nicaragua, named after José
Madriz (magazine), a comic magazine of La Movida Madrileña 
Berceo, village known as Madriz in the Middle Ages